No basta ser madre ("Not Enough to be Mother") is a 1937 Mexican film. It stars Carlos Orellana and Sara García.

External links
 

1937 films
1930s Spanish-language films
Mexican black-and-white films
Mexican drama films
1937 drama films
1930s Mexican films